Martin Danielle (born 22 January 1988), commonly known by his stage name CLMD is a Norwegian music producer, DJ, songwriter and artist.

He is the co-creator and lead member of the electronic music project CLMD, and he founded and manages record company UPNORTH Recordings. He is also the first non vocalist mentor in the history worldwide to be a mentor on the hit television show The Voice. In his career Martin has worked with artists such as Justine Skye, Astrid S, Ingrid Helene Håvik (from Highasakite), Jesper Jenset, and has done official remixes for Bruno Mars, Estelle, Arty, and Nervo among others.

Early life
CLMD started as a project between Carl Louis and Martin Danielle. Carl & Martin first met at the age of 6, and have been close friends ever since. During their high school years, they got introduced to house music and the art of DJing. They are often quoted saying that C-Mos - "2 Million Ways (Axwell Remix)" was the track that got them into electronic music.

Career
CLMDs first international recognized hit was "The Message" under the artist name Carl Louis & Martin Danielle. The track was picked up by Chris Lake and his Rising Music Label and charted by Axwell in 2010. It also went top 10 on Beatport Top 100.
This sparked the interest from many big labels, among others Atlantic Records, Big Beat. For Atlantic, Carl and Martin got the opportunity to do official remixes for Bruno Mars (Just The Way You Are) and for Estelle (Fall in Love). The duo then decided to sign with Steve Angello's SIZE Records, where Carl & Martin released their debut EP, "Little EP" in 2011.

In 2012 Carl & Martin re-branded themselves as "CLMD", started their own label, UPNORTH Recordings and signed a worldwide distribution deal with Sony Music. The first release on UPNORTH was the smash hit "Black Eyes & Blue". The song sold to platinum in Norway and was the 3rd most played song on Norwegian radio in 2012. "Black Eyes & Blue" was also the opening track for The Ultra Music Festival 2012 Official After Movie.
Their release "The Stockholm Syndrome" sold 6× platinum in Norway.

As a DJ act CLMD have played all over North America and Europe.
Some of their major shows includes; Support for Madonna on her MDNA tour (Telenor Arena, Oslo, Norway) Roseland Ballroom (w/Thomas Gold), Size Matters (Governors Island, NY, NY and Fontainebleau, Miami FL,) Club Life (w/Tiesto, Oslo Spektrum, Oslo, Norway)

As of the summer 2014, Carl decided to leave CLMD to focus on his solo career. Martin Danielle is now continuing CLMD as a project and brand. Their release "Wild Men" feat. Sirena is the last release as a duo. The last show as a group where they both played together was at Tulinløkka, Oslo.

In 2015 Martin released three tracks under CLMD. "Keep Dreaming" featuring the vocals of Jared Lee on Ultra Records/Sony Music was released in January. The video featured Playmate Amanda Cerny, which brought additional attention to the track and led to Martins US TV debut on The Morning Show on Playboy TV.

2016 has been the most effective year to date for the CLMD project as its released four single in the first 6 months. "Dust" feat Astrid S, "Wait For Love" (a collaboration with producer KidJoki), "Phoenix" feat Frøder and "Night Train" feat Alida.

"Dust" has become CLMD's biggest release to date with over 13 million streams on Spotify alone. The melody contains interpolations of the late 90s trance hymn 1998 by British DJ duo Binary Finary.

In 2017 Martin was asked to be a mentor on the Norwegian version of the hit TV show The Voice, becoming the first non-vocalist mentor ever worldwide.

Discography

Charted singles

Singles

Awards and nominations

| 2020 || Spellemann Prisen || Song of the Year || CLMD || Nominated
|}

References

Norwegian DJs
Musicians from Bærum
1988 births
Living people
Remixers
Electronic dance music DJs